Templepatrick railway station served the village of Templepatrick in County Antrim on the Belfast-Derry railway line.

History

The station was opened in 1848 as part of the Belfast & Ballymena Railway, which would ultimately become part of the Northern Counties Committee group of lines owned by the LMS. Following the nationalisation of the railways, traffic on the line was reduced until eventually the route between Belfast and Londonderry was diverted via the Lisburn-Antrim railway line, with the stations on the old route, including Templepatrick, closed. Templepatrick was closed in 1981.

Proposals

In 1994, Northern Ireland Railways gained funding approval for the restoration of the Bleach Green section of the Derry line, which would allow more direct services into the centre of Belfast. As part of this project, NIR planned to recommission two new stations,  and Templepatrick. Mossley West opened in 2001, but there was no movement for a station at Templepatrick. However, Translink, the public company responsible for public transport in Northern Ireland, proposed to build a major transport interchange, featuring both a bus and railway station beside the M2 at Templepatrick. As of 2006 it was reported that this could potentially serve as a park and ride for towns and villages in the area of South Antrim.

References

Disused railway stations in County Antrim
Railway stations opened in 1848
Railway stations closed in 1981
Proposed railway stations in Northern Ireland
Grade B1 listed buildings
1848 establishments in Ireland
1981 disestablishments in Northern Ireland
Railway stations in Northern Ireland opened in 1848